Roger Harris is a former Canadian politician, who was a BC Liberal Member of the Legislative Assembly of British Columbia from 2001 to 2005. He represented the riding of Skeena.

External links
Roger Harris

British Columbia Liberal Party MLAs
Year of birth missing (living people)
Living people
21st-century Canadian politicians
Members of the Executive Council of British Columbia